Fritz Mackensen (born 8 April 1866 in Greene, near Kreiensen, Duchy of Brunswick – 12 May 1953 in Bremen) was a German painter of the Düsseldorf school of painting and Art Nouveau. He was a friend of Otto Modersohn and Hans am Ende, and was one of the co-founders of the artists' colony at Worpswede. From 1933 to 1935 he was head of the Nordische Kunsthochschule in Bremen (today's University of the Arts Bremen). In 1937 he became a member of the Nazi Party. He was buried in the Worpswede Cemetery.

Selected works
paintings
"Gottesdienst im Freien", Lower Saxony State Museum in Hanover
"Tierbild", State Museum for Art and Cultural History in Oldenburg in Oldenburg
"Die Scholle", museum Weimar
bronze sculpture
"Alte Frau mit Ziege", Kunsthalle Bremen

References

Bibliography 
 Klaus Dede: Fritz Mackensen. Der Entdecker Worpswedes. (1981), Atelier im Bauernhaus, .

1866 births
1953 deaths
People from Northeim (district)
People from the Duchy of Brunswick
19th-century German painters
19th-century German male artists
German male painters
20th-century German painters
20th-century German male artists
Art Nouveau painters
Nazi Party politicians
Militant League for German Culture members
Stahlhelm members
Academic staff of Bauhaus University, Weimar
Düsseldorf school of painting